Tatjana Đekanović (born 25 February 1997) is a Bosnian sports shooter. She competed in the women's 10 metre air rifle event at the 2016 Summer Olympics and the women's 10 metre air rifle event at the 2020 Summer Olympics.

References

External links
 

1997 births
Living people
Bosnia and Herzegovina female sport shooters
Olympic shooters of Bosnia and Herzegovina
Shooters at the 2016 Summer Olympics
Shooters at the 2020 Summer Olympics
Place of birth missing (living people)
Shooters at the 2015 European Games
European Games competitors for Bosnia and Herzegovina
Serbs of Bosnia and Herzegovina